Saw Swee Leong (born 16 July 1955 in Penang) is a former Malaysian professional badminton player.

Career

Saw Swee Leong supported the Malaysian National Team in the 1976 Thomas Cup. The team made it to the finals before losing to Indonesia by a nine to zero final tally.

Six years later, the team ended up in fifth place in the 1982 Thomas Cup. Losing 5:4 against England in the quarterfinals.

Between the two men's team championships Saw Swee Leong participated in the men's singles at the World Cup in 1980, was defeated there but equal in his opening match against Syed Modi from India.

Sporting Achievements

References

Malaysian report for Thomas Cup

Mike's Badminton Populorum

Malaysian male badminton players
Malaysian sportspeople of Chinese descent
1955 births
Living people
People from Penang
Sportspeople from Penang
Badminton players at the 1978 Commonwealth Games
Commonwealth Games medallists in badminton
Commonwealth Games bronze medallists for Malaysia
20th-century Malaysian people
Medallists at the 1978 Commonwealth Games